Poul Møller (1919-1997) was a Danish politician.

Poul Møller may also refer to:
 
 Paul Barfoed Møller, from the film Jeppe på bjerget
 Poul Martin Møller (1794–1838), Danish academic, writer, and poet